Jessica Moore and Abbie Myers were the defending champions, but both players chose to participate with different partners. Moore partnered Storm Sanders but lost in the semifinals, whilst Myers partnered Pia König, but lost in the first round. 

Lauren Embree and Asia Muhammad won the title, defeating Natela Dzalamidze and Hiroko Kuwata in the final, 7–5, 6–3.

Seeds

Draw

References 
 Draw

Bendigo Women's International - Doubles